Damon Point in Grays Harbor County, Washington is a former Washington State Park. Today, the Washington Department of Natural Resources controls the land, and has been restoring it as bird habitat, especially for the threatened streaked horned lark, but also for other birds, including the snowy plover.

References

External links
Damon Point at Washington Trails Association

State parks of Washington (state)
Parks in Grays Harbor County, Washington